Pancakes-Paris is a children's novel by Claire Huchet Bishop. Set in Paris a few months after the end of World War II, it follows Charles's quest to makes crepes for his little sister for Mardi Gras. The novel, illustrated by Georges Schreiber, was first published in 1947 and was a Newbery Honor recipient in 1948.

References

1947 American novels
American children's novels
Newbery Honor-winning works
Novels set in Paris
Viking Press books
1947 children's books
Novels by Claire Huchet Bishop